Francis Paterson Brown (13 November 1887 – 26 November 1928) was an Australian rules footballer who played with Melbourne and St Kilda in the Victorian Football League (VFL).

Notes

External links 

1887 births
1928 deaths
Australian rules footballers from Melbourne
Melbourne Football Club players
St Kilda Football Club players
People from Berwick, Victoria